Hancock County is a county in the U.S. state of Illinois. According to the 2020 census, it has a population of 17,620. Its county seat is Carthage, and its largest city is Hamilton. The county is made up of rural towns with many farmers.

Hancock County is part of the Fort Madison-Keokuk, IA-IL-MO Micropolitan Statistical Area.

History

Hancock County was part of the "Military Tract" set aside by Congress to reward veterans of the War of 1812. Actual settlement of the interior of the county was delayed by concerns about hostile American Indians. After their defeat in the Blackhawk War in 1832, settlement proceeded quickly.

Hancock County was formed, on January 13, 1825, out of Pike County. It was named in honor of John Hancock, who signed the Declaration of Independence.

For a brief period in the 1840s Hancock had one of Illinois' most populous cities: Nauvoo, which was then headquarters for the Church of Jesus Christ of Latter Day Saints. The movement's founder Joseph Smith was killed in the county seat of Carthage in 1844. Most Mormons left Hancock County in the 1840s. Today, Latter Day Saints come in increasing numbers to important Latter Day Saint sites in Hancock County, partly for vacation and partly for religious pilgrimage.

The original courthouse was at Montebello. Montebello no longer exists but was between Nauvoo and Hamilton. In 1833 the state commissioned the formation of the county seat at Carthage, which was centrally located but not well developed. A log cabin was built to serve as the courthouse and served that purpose until 1839 when the second Carthage Courthouse was built. The original log cabin continued to serve as a school and other purposes until 1945 when it was removed.

The second courthouse cost $3,700 to build and served from 1839 until 1906. It served as a location for Stephen A. Douglas (October 11, 1858) and Abraham Lincoln (October 22, 1858) to speak to residents as they were running against each other for the US Senate. In 1906 it was removed to make room for the current courthouse.

The current courthouse was dedicated October 21, 1908.

Geography

Climate and weather

Major highways
  U.S. Highway 136
  Illinois Route 9
  Illinois Route 61
  Illinois Route 94
  Illinois Route 96
  Illinois Route 336
Illinois 100 . sag 20pxIllinois Route 110

Adjacent counties 
 Lee County, Iowa - northwest
 Henderson County - northeast
 McDonough County - east
 Schuyler County - southeast
 Adams County - south
 Lewis County, Missouri - southwest
 Clark County, Missouri - west

Demographics

As of the 2010 United States Census, there were 19,104 people, 8,040 households, and 5,427 families residing in the county. The racial makeup of the county was 98.0% white, 0.3% black or African American, 0.2% Asian, 0.2% American Indian, 0.1% Pacific islander, 0.3% from other races, and 0.9% from two or more races. Those of Hispanic or Latino origin made up 1.0% of the population. In terms of ancestry, 34.7% were German, 13.8% were English, 13.2% were American, and 12.1% were Irish.

Of the 8,040 households, 27.5% had children under the age of 18 living with them, 55.3% were married couples living together, 8.3% had a female householder with no husband present, 32.5% were non-families, and 28.2% of all households were made up of individuals. The average household size was 2.35 and the average family size was 2.85. The median age was 44.6 years.

The median income for a household in the county was $42,857 and the median income for a family was $55,162. Males had a median income of $41,609 versus $27,648 for females. The per capita income for the county was $22,885. About 8.9% of families and 12.6% of the population were below the poverty line, including 17.8% of those under age 18 and 9.9% of those age 65 or over.

Politics
Hancock County is in Illinois's 18th Congressional District and is currently represented by Republican Darin LaHood. For the Illinois House of Representatives, the county is in the 94th district and is represented by Republican Randy Frese. The county is in the 47th district of the Illinois Senate, and is represented by Republican Jil Tracy.

In presidential elections, Hancock County usually favors Republican candidates, having voted for Democratic presidential candidates only four times during the period of 1940 to 2020 (in 1964, 1988, 1992, and 1996).

Communities

Cities
 Carthage (seat)
 Dallas City (partly in Henderson County)
 Hamilton
 La Harpe
 Nauvoo
 Warsaw

Town
 Bentley

Villages

 Augusta
 Basco
 Bowen
 Elvaston
 Ferris
 Plymouth
 Pontoosuc
 West Point

Unincorporated communities

 Adrian
 Breckenridge
 Burnside
 Chili
 Colusa
 Denver
 Disco
 Durham
 Elderville
 Fountain Green
 Joetta
 La Crosse
 McCall
 Middle Creek
 Niota
 Old Niota
 Powellton
 Saint Mary
 Stillwell
 Sutter
 Tioga
 Webster

Forts
 Fort Johnson

Townships
Hancock County is divided into twenty-four townships:

 Appanoose
 Augusta
 Bear Creek
 Carthage
 Chili
 Dallas City
 Durham
 Fountain Green
 Hancock
 Harmony
 La Harpe
 Montebello
 Nauvoo
 Pilot Grove
 Pontoosuc
 Prairie
 Rock Creek
 Rocky Run-Wilcox
 St. Albans
 St. Mary's
 Sonora
 Walker
 Warsaw
 Wythe

Education
The following is a list of all school districts with any territory in Hancock County, no matter how slight, even if the schools and/or administrative headquarters are in other counties.

K-12:
 Community Unit School District 4
 Hamilton Community Consolidated School District 328
 Nauvoo-Colusa Community Unit School District 325 - A K-12 district, but it has an arrangement with Warsaw district where Nauvoo-Colusa sends its high schoolers to Warsaw while Warsaw sends its junior high school students to Nauvoo-Colusa
 Southeastern Community Unit School District 337
 Warsaw Community Unit School District 316 - A K-12 district, but it has an arrangement with Warsaw district where Warsaw sends its junior high school students to Nauvoo-Colusa while Nauvoo-Colusa sends its high schoolers to Warsaw
 West Prairie Community Unit School District 103

Secondary:
 Illini West High School District 307

Elementary:
 Carthage Elementary School District 317
 Dallas Elementary School District 327
 La Harpe Community School District 347

See also
 National Register of Historic Places listings in Hancock County, Illinois

References

External links
 Office site

 
Illinois counties
1825 establishments in Illinois
Populated places established in 1825
Significant places in Mormonism
Illinois counties on the Mississippi River
Fort Madison–Keokuk, IA-IL-MO Micropolitan Statistical Area